Cotinis barthelemyi is a species of scarab beetle.

References

Cetoniinae
Beetles of North America
Beetles described in 1833